The Grandest Fleet is a turn-based naval tactics game that was released by Quantum Quality Productions for DOS in 1993.

Gameplay
The Grandest Fleet's primary emphasis is on turn based combat between two opposing forces.  Players also need to control and build up coastal cities to increase income, obtain ship building capabilities, and earn victory points.

The game features a random map generator as well as numerous modern historical, fictional, and what-if naval battles from World War I to the fall of the Soviet Union.

Players can also pursue a "career" by earning points over the course of many games. These points can be used to purchase naval and civilian ranks which allow the player to bring in a personal super aircraft carrier flagship into all games. The ability of the player's flagship depends on the player's rank.

Reception
Computer Gaming World rated The Grandest Fleet ("a game, and not a simulation") four stars out of five. Approving of its "replayability and variety", the magazine concluded that "most gamers should find [it] well worth the time and effort". It was later a nominee for the magazine's 1994 "Strategy Game of the Year" award, which ultimately went to UFO: Enemy Unknown. The editors wrote of Fleet, "The game goes beyond The Lost Admiral with a solid economic model, brisk scenarios, and demanding naval campaign."

References

External links
 
 

Computer wargames
DOS games
DOS-only games
1993 video games
Naval video games
Turn-based tactics video games
Video games developed in the United States
Multiplayer and single-player video games
Quantum Quality Productions games